Oligonicella brunneri is one of the smallest species of praying mantis and "scarcely reach(es) one centimeter in length."

References

Thespidae
Mantodea of Europe
Fauna of Italy
Insects described in 1871